Randolph or Randal Crew(e), Esq. (1631–1657) was an English amateur cartographer. He executed a map of Cheshire, and died from violence at Paris.

Life 
Randolph Crew, second son of Sir Clipsby or Clippesby Crew, by Jane, daughter of Sir John Poultney, and grandson of Sir Ranulphe or Randolph Crew, was born at Westminster on 6 April 1631. Fuller, who styles him "a hopefull gentleman", states that "he drew a map of Cheshire so exactly with his pen that a judicious eye would mistake it for printing, and the graver's skill and industry could little improve it. This map I have seen; and, reader, when my eye directs my hand, I may write with confidence." The map in question was published in Daniel King's The Vale Royall of England, or the County Palatine of Chester Illustrated (folio, London, 1656), a work in which Crew seems to have taken a personal share. On an inscription thereon he states that he drew the map with his own pen, and after it was drawn engraved it at his own expense. This seems to be at variance with Fuller's statement quoted above, unless Fuller is alluding to the original drawing only. 

Wishing to perfect his education, Crew travelled abroad, but on 19 September 1657, while walking in the streets of Paris, he was set upon by footpads wearing swords, and received wounds of which he died two days afterwards, at the early age of twenty-six.

Legacy 
He was buried in the Huguenots' burying-place in the Faubourg St. Germain at Paris, and a monument was erected to his memory.

References

Sources 

 
 Fuller, Thomas (1811). The History of the Worthies of England. New ed. Nichols, John (ed.). Vol. 1. London: F. C. and J. Rivington; T. Payne; Wilkie and Robinson; Longman, Hurst, Rees, Orme, and Brown; Cadell and Davies; R. H. Evans; J. Mawman; J. Murray; and R. Baldwin. pp. 193–194.
 Nichols, John Gough (1858). The Topographer and Genealogist. Vol. 3. London: John Bowyer Nichols and Sons. p. 299.
 Omerod, George (1819). The History of Cheshire. Vol. 3. London: Lackington, Hughes, Harding, Mavor, and Jones. p. 170.

Attribution:

 

1631 births
1657 deaths
English cartographers
People from Westminster
Deaths by stabbing in France